Geraint Rhys Davies (born Treherbert, 1 December 1948) is a Plaid Cymru Welsh politician. He was the National Assembly for Wales Member for Rhondda from 1999 to 2003.

Education
Pentre Grammar School; Chelsea College; and the University of London.

Professional career
Post-Graduate Training, Rookwood Hospital, Cardiff 1971–72. Relief Manager and Manager, Boots the Chemists 1972–75. 
Self-Employed Community Pharmacist in Treherbert since 1975. President of Blaenrhondda Football Club and a deacon at Blaencwm Baptist church. School Governor.

Political career
County Borough Councillor for the ward of Treherbert in Rhondda Cynon Taff. Plaid Cymru's spokesperson for the South Wales Valleys and in the National Assembly was a member of the Local Government Partnership Council and Health and Social Services Committee.

References
Profile on the BBC Website September 1999

External links
Plaid Cymru – the Party of Wales Website

Offices held

1948 births
Living people
Councillors in Wales
Alumni of the University of London
People from Treherbert
Plaid Cymru politicians
Plaid Cymru members of the Senedd
Wales AMs 1999–2003
School governors